Matthew Garnell Morgan (born November 7, 1997) is an American professional basketball player for Le Mans of the French Pro A. He played college basketball for Cornell.

High school career
Morgan attended Cox Mill High School, joining the varsity team as a sophomore. He scored 760 points during his junior season. His jersey was retired on senior night as he helped his team claim a share of the South Piedmont championship. Morgan graduated as the school's all-time leading scorer though his records were since broken by Wendell Moore Jr. He received scant collegiate recruiting attention, eventually signing with Cornell.

College career
As a freshman, Morgan compiled six Ivy League rookie of the week honors and was named league player of the week after scoring a school freshman-record 33 points in a win against Harvard. He earned Second Team All-Ivy League honors, averaging 18.9 points, 3.1 rebounds, 2.0 assists and 1.4 steals per game. As a sophomore, Morgan led the Ivy League in scoring, averaging 18.1 points to go with 4.6 rebounds, 2.1 assists and 0.8 steals per game. He was named to the Second Team All-Ivy League. Morgan averaged 22.5 points, 4.6 rebounds and 3.2 assists per game as a junior, earning First Team All-Ivy League honors. Following the season, he declared for the 2018 NBA draft but ultimately returned to school. On January 9, 2019, Morgan scored a career-high 38 points including a school-record nine 3-pointers in an 86-74 win over Towson. He also became the second Cornell player to surpass 2,000 points after Ryan Wittman and set a school record for career free throws with 438 in the victory. As a senior, Morgan averaged 22.2 points, 4.5 rebounds and 3.0 assists per game while shooting 51 percent from the floor and 43 percent from 3-point range. He was named to the First Team All-Ivy League and was selected to play in the Reese’s College All-Star Game. Morgan finished his career at Cornell with 2,333 points, becoming the Ivy League's second all-time leading scorer behind Bill Bradley.

Professional career
After going undrafted in the 2019 NBA draft, Morgan signed with the Toronto Raptors for summer league play. He averaged 4.3 points, two rebounds and one assist per game in the summer league. He signed with the Raptors on October 17, 2019, only to be waived on October 20. Morgan joined the Raptors 905 of the NBA G League and missed the team's second game with an unspecified illness or injury. In the third game of the season, he scored 17 points on 4-of-9 shooting from 3-point range in a loss to the Maine Red Claws, while also contributing five rebounds and five assists. On January 12, 2020, Morgan scored a career-high 21 points in a 123-119 loss to the College Park Skyhawks. Morgan averaged 8.3 points, 2.1 rebounds and 1.9 assists per game in his rookie season for Raptors 905. The following season, he averaged 8.7 points, 1.0 rebound and 2.5 assists per game.

On August 20, 2021, Morgan signed with Konyaspor of the Turkish Basketball First League.

On June 21, 2022, he signed with Le Mans of the French Pro A.

Personal life
Morgan's father Lamont Morgan played basketball at Georgetown in the 1980s. He has 3 Brothers. The middle brother, Malcolm, is currently playing at Emory & Henry University. The two youngest, Myles and Marcus Morgan are twins and are currently playing college basketball for Roanoke College

References

External links
Cornell Big Red bio

1997 births
Living people
American men's basketball players
American expatriate basketball people in Canada
American expatriate basketball people in Turkey
Basketball players from North Carolina
Cornell Big Red men's basketball players
Le Mans Sarthe Basket players
People from Concord, North Carolina
Point guards
Raptors 905 players